Timo Martin Gebhart (born 12 April 1989) is a German professional footballer who most recently played as a midfielder for FC Memmingen.

Club career
In January 2009, Gebhart transferred from 2. Bundesliga side TSV 1860 Munich to join Bundesliga side VfB Stuttgart. He signed a contract until 30 June 2013.

In July 2012, Gebhart moved to 1. FC Nürnberg.

In January 2016, Gebhart moved to FC Steaua București.

At the end of the 2016–17 season, Hansa Rostock and Gebhart did not agree on a contract extension.

Gebhart returned to his former club TSV 1860 Munich for the 2017–18 season. He scored 5 goals and assisted 4 in 12 matches in all competitions but was kept out of action by injuries for large parts of the season. 1860 Munich decided not to renew his contract.

On 4 February 2019, it was confirmed, that Gehbart had signed with FC Viktoria 1889 Berlin.

In September 2020, he signed a one-year contract with hometown club FC Memmingen of the fourth-tier Regionalliga Bayern.

Career statistics

Club

Honours
Steaua București
League Cup: 2015–16

References

External links

 

Living people
1989 births
People from Memmingen
Sportspeople from Swabia (Bavaria)
Association football midfielders
German footballers
Footballers from Bavaria
FC Viktoria 1889 Berlin players
TSV 1860 Munich players
TSV 1860 Munich II players
VfB Stuttgart players
1. FC Nürnberg players
1. FC Nürnberg II players
FC Steaua București players
FC Hansa Rostock players
FC Memmingen players
Regionalliga players
Bundesliga players
2. Bundesliga players
Liga I players
3. Liga players
Germany under-21 international footballers
German expatriate footballers
German expatriate sportspeople in Romania
Expatriate footballers in Romania
Germany youth international footballers